Osezhino is a rural locality (a selo) in Albazinsky Selsoviet of Skovorodinsky District, Amur Oblast, Russia. The population was 11 as of 2018.

Geography 
It is located 120 km from Skovorodino, 35 km from Albazino.

References 

Rural localities in Skovorodinsky District